Maulana Syed Nek Zaman is a Pakistani politician who served as a member of the 12th National Assembly of Pakistan from 6 November 2002 to 2 October 2007.

References

Living people
Pakistani Islamic religious leaders
Pakistani MNAs 2002–2007
People from North Waziristan
Year of birth missing (living people)